The twenty-second season of The Bachelor premiered on January 1, 2018. This season features 36-year-old Arie Luyendyk Jr., a real estate agent and race car driver from Scottsdale, Arizona. Luyendyk was the runner-up on the eighth season of The Bachelorette featuring Emily Maynard. 

The season concluded on March 5, 2018, with Luyendyk choosing to propose to 27-year-old publicist Becca Kufrin. However, Luyendyk subsequently ended his engagement with Kufrin and admitted that he was still in love with runner-up Lauren Burnham, and he proposed to Burnham on the live After the Final Rose special. They married in January 2019, and are currently living in Phoenix, Arizona with their three children, Alessi, Lux, and Senna.

Production

Casting and contestants

On September 7, 2017, during Good Morning America, Luyendyk was announced as the next Bachelor over The Bachelorette season 13 runner-up Peter Kraus, who was the fan favorite choice for the role.

Notable cast includes Miss Massachusetts USA 2014 and Miss USA 2014 competitor Caroline Lunny, and Miami Dolphins Cheerleader Bibiana Julian.

Filming and development
This season traveled to Lake Tahoe; Fort Lauderdale, Florida; Paris, France; Tuscany, Italy and Peru. Appearances for this season included racing driver Robby Gordon, Gorgeous Ladies of Wrestling wrestlers Ursula Hayden and Angelina Altishin, wrestler and The Bachelorette contestant Kenny King, singer/songwriter Connor Duermit, country band Lanco, indie singer and songwriter Tenille Arts and French singer Pauline Paris.

Contestants
This season began with 29 contestants.

Future appearances

The Bachelorette
Becca Kufrin was chosen as the bachelorette for season 14 of The Bachelorette, while Tia Booth, Seinne Fleming, Kendall Long, Caroline Lunny and Bekah Martinez made their appearances in two episodes as well.

Bachelor in Paradise
Season 5

Julian returned for the fifth season of Bachelor in Paradise, along with Annaliese Puccini, Chelsea Roy, Kendall Long, Krystal Nielson, Nysha Norris, Tia Booth, Jenna Cooper, Caroline Lunny, Jacqueline Trumbull, and Olivia Goethals. Julian, Lunny, Norris, and Trumbull were eliminated during week 2. Roy was eliminated during week 4. Booth split from her partner, Colton Underwood, during week 4. Long split from her partner, Joe Amabile, during week 5 but reunited with him outside of Paradise. Goethals split from her partner, John Graham, during week 6. Puccini left Paradise in a relationship with Kamil Nicalek, while Cooper and Nielson ended the season engaged to Jordan Kimball and Chris Randone, respectively.

Season 6

Puccini and Julian returned for the sixth season of Bachelor in Paradise. Both were eliminated during week 1.

Season 7

Long and Booth returned to compete in season 7 alongside Kufrin. Long quit in week 4. Kufrin split from Thomas Jacobs week 6, although they've gotten back together. Booth split from Aaron Clancy week 6.

Australia season 2

Lunny appeared in the Australian version of Bachelor in Paradise. She left the show in week 7 to pursue a relationship with fellow US contestant, Alex Bordyukov, who was also competing on that season. However, the pair is no longer together.

The Bachelor Winter Games
Bibiana Julian and Lauren Griffin returned for The Bachelor Winter Games under Team USA. Griffin was eliminated during week 1. Julian quit during week 4.

Call-out order

 The contestant received the first impression rose
 The contestant received a rose during the date
 The contestant was eliminated
 The contestant was eliminated during the date
 The contestant was eliminated outside the rose ceremony
 The contestant quit the competition
 The contestant won the competition

Episodes

Post-show
During the live season finale, it was revealed that a few weeks after filming wrapped, Arie had quickly called off his engagement to Becca and started dating runner-up Lauren. 

Arie and Lauren got engaged during the After the Final Rose special. Arie and Lauren got married on January 12, 2019. They have three children together, Alessi Ren (born May 29, 2019), and twins, Lux Jacob and Senna James (born June 11, 2021).

Becca got engaged to Thomas Jacobs, who was a contestant on season 17 of The Bachelorette, in May 2022.

Controversies

Bekah Martinez missing person's case

Bekah Martinez was reported missing by her mother during the filming of this season. Her mother tried to claim that Martinez informed her she was working on a marijuana farm instead of being on national television and filed the missing person's report on November 18, 2017. Authorities from Humboldt County Sheriff's Department tried to locate and reach her but their attempts were unsuccessful. That very same day, Martinez eventually went home and remained on the missing person's list. Her mother reported her missing, but ended up discovering that Martinez was indeed not missing.

Minnesota Bachelor ban
In the aftermath of the season, Minnesota House of Representatives member Drew Christensen signed a document bill to ban Luyendyk to prevent travel from or to Minnesota, Becca Kufrin's home state. As stated on the document "the state of Minnesota hereby adopts a policy of zero tolerance of Arie Luyendyk, Jr. from season 22 of ‘The Bachelor.’ It is state policy that every person in the state has a right to live free from the presence of Arie Luyendyk, Jr. in the state."

Notes

References

External links
 

The Bachelor (American TV series) seasons
2018 American television seasons
Television shows filmed in California
Television shows filmed in Arizona
Television shows filmed in Nevada
Television shows filmed in Florida
Television shows filmed in France
Television shows filmed in Italy
Television shows filmed in Arkansas
Television shows filmed in Virginia
Television shows filmed in Minnesota
Television shows filmed in Peru